Benjamin Levi Ross (born January 15, 1998) is an American stage actor and singer. He is best known for his work in the Tony Award winning musical Dear Evan Hansen, where he played Evan, Connor and Jared (understudy) on Broadway and Evan in the national tour.

Early life and education 
Ross was born to a Jewish family on January 15, 1998, and grew up in Santa Monica, California. He attended Santa Monica High School, where he was active in his school's theater program. In 2016, he was named a Presidential Scholar of the Arts as part of the 2016 U.S. Presidential Scholars Program. He was also a grand prize finalist for the 2016 Music Center Spotlight awards. Following high school, he attended Carnegie Mellon University for a year and a half.

Career 
At an audition for the play The Low Road at New York's Public Theater, Ross was noticed by Dear Evan Hansen director Michael Greif, who told Ross that he would be great as an understudy in the cast of Dear Evan Hansen. Soon after, he joined Dear Evan Hansens cast, and made his Broadway debut as the character Jared. Ross then spent ten months understudying for the roles of Evan, Connor, and Jared. In 2018, he left the Broadway company and joined the first national tour of the show in the titular role. He left the production on September 15, 2019. From January 29 to February 3, 2020, Ross starred as Henry in the Kennedy Center's production of Next to Normal. In 2021, Ross appeared in the film Tick, Tick... Boom! as Freddy.

Personal life 
Ross is gay and non-binary, using they/them and he/him pronouns.

Film credits

Theater credits

Awards and nominations

See also
 LGBT culture in New York City
 List of LGBT people from New York City

Notes

References

External links 

1998 births
21st-century American actors
21st-century American Jews
21st-century LGBT people
Actors from Santa Monica, California
American gay actors
American male musical theatre actors
American non-binary actors
Jewish American male actors
LGBT people from California
Living people
LGBT Jews